The Fisher River Hawks were a Junior "B" ice hockey team based in Fisher River, Manitoba. They were members of the Keystone Junior Hockey League (KJHL). The franchise was founded in 2014.

History
Fisher River Cree Nation was approved for a Junior B hockey team by the KJHL in April 2014. The community of Fisher River officially named their new franchise hockey team the Fisher River Hawks. The team play all home games at the Bryden Cochrane Sr. Sports Complex.

The Fisher River Hawks played their first regular season game on October 17, 2014, against the Peguis Juniors. The Hawks won their first league game on November 19, 2014, defeating the Lundar Falcons 3–2.

The 2015–16 season was the first playoff appearance for the Hawks, winning their first playoff game 15–10 over the Norway House North Stars. They would lose the next two games and were eliminated.

In October 2018 the Hawks announced they were taking a one-year leave of absence from the league.

Season-by-season record

Note: GP = Games played, W = Wins, L = Losses, T = Ties, OTL = Overtime Losses, Pts = Points, GF = Goals for,   GA = Goals against, PCT = Winning Percentage

Franchise records

References

External links
Fisher River Cree Nation
Keystone Junior Hockey League

Defunct ice hockey teams in Manitoba